Ulta Gadha  Dham, which is also called Garha Mafi, about eight kilometers from Gauriganj, located on the Munshiganj road from Gauriganj, about three kilometers from the Darpipur intersection, there is a 55 feet statue of Shri Hanuman ji located in the village Gadha Mafi, which is upside down. Its height is 55 feet from the claws and its height is 75 feet from the ground, here along with Brahma ji, Lord Vishnu and Mata Lakshmi, Shankar ji, Parvati Mata,  Durga Ji and Sai Baba's platform are established.

History
According to the local people, 200 years ago there was the kingdom of Raja Raktambha Singh. It is said that he was a descendant of Lord Rama, It is said that once this place, which is called Garha Mafi, used to be the palace of King Maharajos, but sometimes for some reason just some objectionable incident happened due to which the place turned upside down, which is today known as Ulta Gadha. The fort located here was turned upside down due to earthquake or divine calamity hundreds of years ago. Due to which this place is also called by the local people upside down. Apart from the government, the information about the existence of ruins and arches of the fort has also been given to the Archaeological Department.

Transportation 
The closest airport to Ulta Gadha Dham is Charan Singh Airport, Lucknow. The nearest railway station is Gauriganj Railway Station which connected with all important cities in the country. There are also private taxis available from Gauriganj on the journey, car rickshaws, rickshaws and tempos.

See also
 Mata Mawai Dham
 Lodi Baba Mandir
 Nandmahar Dham
 Durgan Dham Temple

References

External links

Hanuman temples
Hindu temples in Uttar Pradesh
Amethi district